nrg360 (previously "nrg") was one of the major Israeli news sites, which at the end was owned by the Israel Hayom group and operated in cooperation with the newspaper Makor Rishon.

The site was founded by Maariv Holdings, the parent company of Maariv, and until 2014 was called "NRG Maariv". The site operated in cooperation with the newspaper Maariv until 2014, when the site was sold to the Israel Hayom group and changed its name to nrg. In 2017, the site was changed to nrg360 due to the launch of the "360 full picture" application and the mobile version that redirected to 360. On January 10, 2018, the site was closed and its contents accumulated during the years of its operation were transferred to the Makor Rishon website.

See also 
Media of Israel
Maariv (newspaper)
Makor Rishon

References

External links
 nrg archive

Israeli news websites
Israeli brands